Hinnerup, is a small town in East Jutland, Denmark with a population of 8,164 (1 January 2022), located in Favrskov Municipality, Region Midtjylland, Jutland just northwest of Aarhus. It is more or less a suburb nowadays, connected to Aarhus by the urban tract of Søften, Lisbjerg and Skejby.

Until 1 January 2007 Hinnerup was the site of the municipal council of the now former Hinnerup Municipality. It is now the municipal seat of Favrskov Municipality

The railway town of 'Hinnerup Stationsby' emerged in 1862. The town later gave name to the now non existing Hinnerup Municipality formed in 1967, by fusing the parishes of Grundfør, Vitten, Haldum and Vitten with the Søften-Foldby Municipality.

During recent years, Hinnerup has expanded with newly built residential areas and the town centre has been renovated to make it more attractive to shoppers.

A central building is "Hinnerup Bibliotek og Kulturhus" (Library and Cultural House), which opened in May 1993. The modern building has been designed by Hans Peter Svendler Nielsen from architectural firm 3XN, in Aarhus. In April 2002, an arson ruined most of the library facilities; however, it was re-opened in November the same year. The building also houses small art exhibitions and serves as a tiny ticket sales office for the railway line going right by.

In 2012, the city celebrated its 150th anniversary, with a visit by Frederik, the Crown Prince of Denmark and his wife, Mary, Crown Princess of Denmark.

Notable people 
 Dame Adeline Genée DBE (1878 in Hinnerup – 1970) a Danish/British ballet dancer
 Lars Hjortshøj (born 1967 in Hinnerup) a Danish stand-up comedian and TV and radio host

Sister cities
The following cities were twinned with Hinnerup:

  Saarijärvi, Western Finland, Finland

External links
Official municipality website
Library and Cultural House Website

References

Municipal seats of the Central Denmark Region
Municipal seats of Denmark
Towns and settlements in Favrskov Municipality
Favrskov Municipality